Quesnoy-sur-Deûle (literally Quesnoy on Deûle) is a commune in the Nord department in northern France. It is part of the Métropole Européenne de Lille.

Population

Heraldry

See also
Communes of the Nord department

References

Quesnoysurdeule
French Flanders